, lit. 'dewy ground', is the Japanese term used for the garden through which one passes to the chashitsu for the tea ceremony. The roji generally cultivates an air of simplicity.

Development
Sen no Rikyū is said to have been important in the development of the roji. At his Myōki-an, the 'sleeve-brushing pine' gained its name from the garden's diminutive size. For his tea house at Sakai, he planted hedges to obscure the view over the Inland Sea, and only when a guest bent over the tsukubai would he see the view. Rikyū explained his design by quoting a verse by Sōgi. Kobori Enshū was also a leading practitioner.

Features
The roji is usually divided into an outer and inner garden, with a machiai (waiting arbour). Typical features include the tsukubai (ablution basin), tōrō (lantern), tobi ishi (stepping stones), and wicket gate. Ostentatious plantings are generally avoided in preference for moss, ferns, and evergreens, although ume and Japanese maple are found.

Influence
Sadler argues that the roji, with its small size, harmonious proportions, and 'simple suggestiveness' served as a model for domestic Japanese courtyard gardens.

Burakumin
In the works of Japanese writer Nakagami Kenji, roji, in the sense of "alley", can also be understood as a euphemism for the buraku ghettos, where burakumin people used to live.

See also

Tea garden
Moss garden
Tsubo-niwa

References

External links

Chadō